David Loy Stewart (19 May 1927 – 19 August 2010) was an Australian rules footballer who played for Geelong in the Victorian Football League (VFL) during the early 1950s. 

Stewart enlisted in the Australian Army shortly after his eighteenth birthday and served until 1947.

Stewart came to Geelong from Albury and in his brief career was used mostly in the ruck and defence. He was a back pocket in Geelong's 11 point Grand Final win over Essendon in 1951.

References

Holmesby, Russell and Main, Jim (2007). The Encyclopedia of AFL Footballers. 7th ed. Melbourne: Bas Publishing.

External links

1927 births
Australian rules footballers from New South Wales
Geelong Football Club players
Geelong Football Club Premiership players
Albury Football Club players
2010 deaths
One-time VFL/AFL Premiership players